Sergey Nikolayevich Karyakin (born 5 January 1988) is a Russian modern pentathlete. He held the individual world title in 2010 and the team world title in 2011, finishing second in relay in 2009 and 2011.

Karyakin started as a swimmer and competed in biathlon (swimming and running) before changing to modern pentathlon and winning the junior world title in 2008. His strongest event is swimming and weakest is fencing. He shares his name with two other world champions, in chess and rally racing.

References

1988 births
Living people
Russian male modern pentathletes